Manav Kaul (born 19 December 1976) is an Indian theatre director, playwright, author, actor and filmmaker. He was nominated for the Filmfare Award for Best Supporting Actor for his role in the films Tumhari Sulu (2017) and Saina (2021).

Early life
Kaul was born on 19 December 1976 in Baramulla, Jammu and Kashmir, India, into a Kashmiri Pandit family. His family later moved to Hoshangabad, Madhya Pradesh, where he was raised.

He was a competitive swimmer in his late teenage years and participated in state and national levels championships. He has won 14 national medals in swimming.

Career
Kaul started a theatre group named Aranya in 2004.

His influences include Charles Bukowski, Vinod Kumar Shukla, Franz Kafka and Nirmal Verma, to whom he paid homage in his 2010 play Red Sparrow.

In 2012, Kaul debuted as a film director with Hansa, for which he also wrote the screenplay. He made his acting debut in Hindi cinema with fantasy film Jajantaram Mamantaram in 2003, and has been lauded for his performance as a right-wing politician in the Gujarat-based Hindi drama Kai Po Che! in 2013.

Plays
Amongst his notable plays are Ilhaam, Park and Shakkar ke Paanch Daane, the last one being his first work as playwright and director.

In 2004, Kaul staged Shakkar Ke Paanch Daane (Five Grains of Sugar), a dramatic monologue in Hindi about a small-towner whose "structured middle-India existence begins to feel suspiciously like a lie." It featured actor Kumud Mishra, who was to become his longtime collaborator. The Mumbai Theatre Guide wrote, "the final poetic denouement is neat, funny, reflective but unfortunately all too expected, all too perfect." The play was a stage hit and was performed in English in 2009, from a translation by Arshia Sattar.

In his next play, Peele Scooter Wala Aadmi Kaul explored a father-son relationship in an open-ended narrative, and adopted a style of poetic dialogue similar to that employed by Vinod Kumar Shukla and Nirmal Verma. It won him a Mahindra Excellence in Theatre Award (META) for Best Script in 2006.

In 2006, moving away from internal monologues, Kaul staged a bitter-sweet meditation on old age called Bali aur Shambhu, featuring Sudhir Pandey and Mishra. The Times of India found it "not as philosophical as Shakkar Ke Paanch Daane, yet, it's a story that tugs at your heartstrings and has its moments," while the Mumbai Theatre Guide described it as "one of those plays that appeal to the senses but not to the intellect." Said Kaul, "I wrote the play after I visited an old-age home. I wanted to show that people in old-age homes also have fun."

In 2009, Kaul directed Ranga Shankara's Hindi adaptation of Jean-Paul Sartre's Huis Clos, with The Hindu describing his "treatment of non-verbal, physical expression" as impressive.

Filmography
All films and shows in Hindi unless otherwise stated.

Film actor

Film director

Television

Web series

Awards and nominations

Theatre

Mahindra Excellence in Theatre Award for Best Script, 2006.

Hindustan Times Mumbai's Most Stylish Theatre Personality  Award, 2017.

Cinema

Filmfare Awards

Filmfare OTT Awards

Screen Awards

Others

 2018 – Power Brands Bollywood Award for Best Supporting Actor – Tumhari Sulu

Bibliography
All books in Hindi.

 Theek Tumhare Peeche (2016): Short story collection.
 Prem Kabootar (2017): Short story collection. (English translation: A Night in the Hills, (2019))
 Tumhare Baare Mein
 Bahut Door, Kitna Door Hota Hai: Travelogue
 Chalta Phirta Pret
 Antima: Novel
 Karta Ne Karm Se
 Shirt Ka Teesra Button (2022)
 Rooh (2022): Travelogue
 Titali (2023): Novel

References

External links
 
 

 Manav Kaul at Indiancine.ma

1976 births
Living people
Indian male screenwriters
Film directors from Jammu and Kashmir
Indian theatre directors
Indian male dramatists and playwrights
Kashmiri Pandits
Male actors from Jammu and Kashmir
Male actors in Hindi cinema
People from Baramulla
Indian writers
Hindi dramatists and playwrights